Bhat De Haramzada, Noile Manchitro Khabo is a famous Bengali-language Bangladeshi poem written by Rafiq Azad. It is included in his poetry book Simaboddho Jole, Simito Sobuje. Its subject is Bangladesh famine of 1974 that was the cause of food shortage in Bangladesh. The poet mentioned Sheikh Mujibur Rahman in the poem indirectly who is founder of Bangladesh. It has 33 rhythmic lines.

Background 
In 1974, three years after Bangladesh's independence, a famine occurred due to rampant corruption that resulted in food shortages in the country at that time. At that time, a journalist of Daily Ittefaq took photos of one person wearing a net and another one pretending to eat vomit and published these in the newspaper. After seeing the propaganda photos, Rafiq Azad got angry and wrote the poem. The poem was published in the poetry book Simaboddho Jole, Simito Sobuje. The book was banned by the then government for the poem. After writing the poem, some people became his enemies. Even though the then prime minister Sheikh Mujibur Rahman did not tell him anything, Rafiq Azad had to submit the reason for writing the poem to the Deputy inspector general of police in written form as an accountability at the Special Branch office.

Themes 
The main theme of the poem is the Bangladesh famine of 1974. At that time, the lack of food caused the reaction in the public mind, the poet highlighted in his poem. Columnist Aktar Hosen thinks that the poet blamed Sheikh Mujibur Rahman for the famine in the poem and called him "Haramzada". For that, he criticised the poet.

Analysis 
As a prose poem, open syllable and blank verse forms are used here.

Reception 
This poem was popular with Siraj Sikder and the members of National Socialist Party. Humayun Azad called the poem Rafiq Azad's "fury expressed in slang". Imdadul Haq Milan said about the poem, "Rafiq Azad was a imperious freedom fighter. He was the assistant of Kader Siddique. He was a follower of Bangabandhu Sheikh Mujibur Rahman. He shook the country by writing the poem during the famine of the 1974..."

References

External links 
 The poem on Banglarkobita.com

Further reading 
 

1974 poems
1974 in Bangladesh
Bangladeshi poems
Bengali-language poems
Works about famine
Bangladeshi political slogans
Works about Sheikh Mujibur Rahman